Aleksandr Pavlovich Bubnov (1908–1964) was a noted Soviet painter, best known for the portraits of Stalin and for a monumental canvas, "Morning on the Kulikovo Field". He got the Stalin Prize in 1948 and became the corresponding member of the Soviet Academy of Arts in 1954.

Biography

Early years
When the service was over, the family returned to the Saratov Province, in the town of Atkarsk. With the beginning of the First World War in 1914, the father was again called up for service, and the mother and the boy lived for three years in the village of Bubnovka with his grandfather. His father came back sick and the family again moved to Atkarsk, where the boy began to study at a school. In parallel with his studies in a regular school, he went to an art studio for a while, but it was soon closed due to the Russian Civil War. The young boy loved to draw and made sketches from life with pencil and charcoal. Fedorov, his teacher at an art studio, taught not only to draw, but also history and local history. His students participated in archaeological excavations near Atkarsk, where Bubnov also made sketches. In the group photo of graduates in 1926, he was taken with a pencil and an album for sketches. In 1926 or 1927 he moved to Moscow and entered the Higher Art and Technical Institute, (Vkhutein) where Konstantin Istomin was his teacher. In 1930 Vkhutein was split up into six smaller trade-oriented schools and its heritage began to be described by the derogatory (and dangerous) word "formalistic". Bubnov was also criticized for his style and did not turn to Socialist realism until the middle nineteen‐thirties.

Career
In 1929, Bubnov joined the Association of Artists of Revolutionary Russia (AKhRR) and began to participate in its exhibitions but in 1930 he was sent to Kuznetsktstroy  in Siberia as a junior architect, and his painting work was interrupted. In 1932 he returned to Moscow. According to his memoirs, "The first work "Killed in Battle" was presented  at the exhibition "15 years of the Red Army", the second, "Whites in the Town" — at the exhibition of young artists in 1934." In 1936, he painted the "Oktyabriny" (Octobering) showing the secular new-invented rite, which was supposed to supplant a baptism (Krestiny in Russian). This painting was presented at the exhibition "The Industry of Socialism". In the painting Yablochko (1938), which depicts a famous dance, Bubnov tried to draw from life, though not completely. He took part in the creation of a huge panel of "Well Known People of the U.S.S.R." for the 1939 New York World's Fair. In the same year he painted the picture Comrade Stalin Among Collective Farmers.

After the beginning of the Great Patriotic War, he drew propaganda posters, painted pictures on military subjects, such as "Dying, but did not Surrender", "To the Combat Position", "Borodino Field in 1942". He also wrote a portrait of Alexander Matrosov. In 1943-1947 he creates his most famous work "Morning on the Kulikovo Field" dedicated to the epic battle of the 14th century and in 1948 got the Stalin Prize for it.

After the war, Bubnov painted landscapes, genre scenes and pictures on mythological and historical themes; in particular, he created illustrations for the Pushkin's ballad "Song of the Wise Oleg". In 1954 he became a corresponding member of USSR Academy of Arts and also got the title Honored Artist of the RSFSR. In the last years of his life, he painted illustrations for the books of Gogol and Taras Shevchenko. His triptych "Pugachev. Popular uprising" remained unfinished. He died on 30 June 1964 and was buried at the Novodevichy Cemetery in Moscow.

References

1908 births
1964 deaths
Artists from Tbilisi
People from Tiflis Governorate
20th-century Russian painters
Russian male painters
Soviet painters
Socialist realist artists
Stalin Prize winners
Burials at Novodevichy Cemetery